Kocuria varians is a gram-positive species of bacteria in the genus Kocuria. It has been isolated from milk, meat, skin, soil, and beach sand. It is 0.9 to 1.5 micrometers in diameter, and occurs in clusters, which can be up to 4 millimeters in diameter and are yellow. It is known to cause ocular infections, brain abscesses, and endophthalmitis.

References 

Micrococcaceae
Bacteria described in 1900